Halgurd Mulla Mohammed Taher Zebari  (born 1 July 1988) is a former Iraqi football player of Kurdish ethnicity who last played as a left winger for Al-Quwa Al-Jawiya in Iraq. His older brother Hawar Mulla Mohammed is also a retired Iraqi national team player and former teammates at club level.

Career

Born in Mosul in March 1988, he started his playing career with local club Sulaymaniyah FC in 2004. With his brother an integral part of the Iraqi Olympic side and national senior team, Halkard thrived at club level, spending his first two years establishing his place as one of the nation's burgeoning stars.

He was first thrust into the international arena in the 2006 AFC Youth Championship, when he played in all four of Iraq's matches and was on target in the 2-2 draw against Saudi Arabia. After going on to feature in Iraq's failed qualifying campaign for the Olympic Football Tournament Beijing 2008, Mohammed made his senior debut in a friendly 1-1 against Jordan.

Inspired by Hawar's success, he has worked hard to emulate his brother's achievements. Now, with the FIFA Confederation Cup South Africa 2009 beckoning, the Iraqi fans will expect big things from the Mohammed brothers as they come together for the first time on the global stage.

National teams

Iraq Youth team 
Halgurd was part of the Iraqi squad at the AFC Youth Championship 2006, he played four games and scored one goal at the 2-2 draw with Saudi Arabia.

Iraq Olympic team 
Halgurd was part with Iraq Olympic team in the Football at the 2008 Summer Olympics - Men's qualification campaign, he played several matches and helped Iraq to reach the final qualification stages.

Iraq national team debut 
In 2007 Halgurd made his debut in a friendly match against Jordan and the match ended 1-1.

VIVA World Cup and Iraqi Kurdistan regional team 
In 2008 Halgurd took part in the 2008 VIVA World Cup with Iraqi Kurdistan and scored Iraqi Kurdistan's 2nd goal against Sapmi football team in the first match of the tournament, the match ended 2-2.
In the second match against Provence, where Kurdistan won  3-0, Halgurd scored a brace. Kurdistan went on to win the VIVA World Cup for the first time in their history, beating North Cyprus 2-1, with Halgurd scoring the first goal of the match by a calm finish from the penalty spot.

Honours 

Erbil SC
 Iraqi Premier League 
 Winner : 2011-2012
 Runner Up(3): 2010-2011 , 2012-2013 , 2013-2014
AFC Cup
Runner Up (2):2012,2014

Al Quwa Al Jawiya
AFC Cup
 Winner : 2016

External links

Profile on Goalzz.com
Official Forum

1988 births
Living people
Iraqi footballers
Iraq international footballers
2009 FIFA Confederations Cup players
Iraqi Kurdish people
People from Mosul
Kurdish sportspeople
Erbil SC players
Association football wingers
Association football forwards
AFC Cup winning players